Leon Marks Lion (12 March 1879 – 28 March 1947) was an English stage and film actor, playwright, theatrical director and producer. He starred in Joseph Jefferson Farjeon's 1925 hit play Number 17 as well as its subsequent 1932 film adaptation by Alfred Hitchcock.

Selected filmography
 The Woman Who Was Nothing (1915)
 Hard Times (1915)
 The Chinese Puzzle (1919)
 Chin Chin Chinaman (1932)
 Number Seventeen (1932)
 The Chinese Puzzle (1932)
 The Amazing Quest of Ernest Bliss (1936)
 Strange Boarders (1938)
 Crackerjack (1938)

References

External links
Leon M. Lion Papers at the Harry Ransom Center

Plays by Leon M. Lion on Great War Theatre

1879 births
1947 deaths
English male stage actors
English male film actors
English male silent film actors
English theatre directors
English theatre managers and producers
English male dramatists and playwrights
Male actors from London
20th-century English male actors